Sweden participated at the 2010 Winter Olympics in Vancouver, British Columbia, Canada. 106 competitors competed in nine of the fifteen disciplines.

Medalists
The following Swedish athletes won medals at the games:

Alpine skiing

Men

Women

1. Kajsa Kling was scheduled to participate in the downhill, super-G and combined events as well but withdrew due to illness.

Biathlon 

Men

Women

Cross-country skiing 

Men

Women

Sprint

2. Anna Haag was scheduled to participate in the 4 x 5 km relay event, and she and Magdalena Pajala were scheduled to participate in the 30 km classical event but withdrew due to illness.

Reigning olympic champion in women's team sprint, Lina Andersson, was also drafted for the team, but was unable to participate due to illness.

Curling 

Summary

Men's tournament

Team: Niklas Edin (skip), Sebastian Kraupp, Fredrik Lindberg, Viktor Kjäll, Oskar Eriksson (alternate).

Round-robin

Draw 1

Draw 2

Draw 3

Draw 4

Draw 5

Draw 6

Draw 7

Draw 8

Draw 9

Standings

Tiebreaker

Final rounds
Semifinal

Bronze medal game

Women's tournament

Team: Anette Norberg (skip), Eva Lund, Cathrine Lindahl, Anna Le Moine, Kajsa Bergström (alternate).

Round-robin

Draw 1

Draw 2

Draw 3

Draw 6

Draw 7

Draw 9

Draw 10

Draw 11

Draw 12

Standings

Final rounds
Semifinal

Final

Figure skating 

Sweden has qualified one entrant in men's singles, for a total of one athlete.

Freestyle skiing 

Men

Women

Ice hockey 

Summary

Men's tournament

Sweden went into the tournament as the ruling Olympic champions.
Roster

Group play
All times are local (UTC-8).

Standings

Final rounds
Quarterfinal

Women's tournament

Sweden is looking to improve on the silver medal from the previous tournament.
Roster

Group play
Sweden will play in Group A.
All times are local (UTC-8).

Standings

Final rounds
Semifinal

Bronze medal game

Snowboarding

Speed skating 

Men

Team pursuit

See also 
 Sweden at the 2010 Winter Paralympics

References

External links
 OS-uttagna - List of Sweden's participants

Winter Olympics
Nations at the 2010 Winter Olympics
2010